is a Japanese journalist and filmmaker. Her work focuses on gender equality and human rights issues. Itō's activism led to her inclusion in the Time 100 Most Influential People of 2020.

Early life

Shiori Itō was born in 1989, the first of three children.  Her father worked in construction and her mother was a housewife.  She began modelling at age 9.  In high school, she did a homestay with a family in rural Kansas in the US.  She intended to study journalism, and attended a junior college while saving money to study abroad.  She left Japan to study abroad in New York in 2012, where she majored in photography.  She then transferred to Italy in 2013, and returned to New York in summer 2014, where she began an internship at the Nippon TV branch office there.  She then returned to Japan, where she took up an internship at the Japanese branch of Reuters.

Career
In 2013, Itō attended a university in New York where she majored in journalism and photography. In 2015, she interned at Thomson Reuters where she wrote a couple of columns on Japanese society. She is now a freelance journalist and filmmaker.

Litigation

Sexual assault lawsuit

While interning at Thomson Reuters, Itō was at an izakaya in Ebisu, Shibuya with Noriyuki Yamaguchi, a prominent TV journalist and acquaintance of then-Japanese Prime Minister Shinzo Abe. She became intoxicated and was told to go back to the hotel where she alleges, Yamaguchi raped her. Yamaguchi denied the allegation, saying they had consensual intercourse. She said her experience with Japan's legal system showed her that victims of sex crimes were undermined and ignored. She called for the Japanese parliament to update Japan's laws regarding rape, which were over a century old. She explains how she could not get information on which hospital provides rape kits without going through a preliminary interview in person. When she went to the police, she was discouraged from filing a report, and informed her career would be ruined for no reason if she did this. She was told she did not act like a victim and had to be interviewed by several officers, including one who made her reenact the rape with a dummy while he took pictures. Although they initially said they would arrest Yamaguchi, the case and charges were unexpectedly dropped. Itō then went to the media, but no one would take her story. When she spoke about the experience at a press conference, she made national news and immediately started receiving negative backlash, hate mail, and threats. She has subsequently become the face of the Me Too movement in Japan.

The journalist's move was called bold by many because of Japan's history when it comes to addressing issues such as rape. “Women journalists face severe consequences for raising their voice and we support Shiori’s move to approach this legally in one of the landmark cases in Japan and the world,” The Coalition For Women In Journalism's founding director, Kiran Nazish, said.

Itō formally filed a civil suit against Yamaguchi in September 2017 for sexually assaulting her in a hotel on 4 April 2015. Itō previously filed a police report in July 2016, although it was dropped by prosecutors for insufficient evidence. Itaru Nakamura, a close confidant of both Prime Minister Abe and Yamaguchi and acting chief of the Tokyo Metropolitan Police Department Investigative Division at the time, admitted in the weekly magazine Shukan Shincho to have halted the probe and arrest warrant. Ito subsequently filed a complaint with Committee for the Inquest of Prosecution, but a September 2017 ruling did not charge Yamaguchi since "there was no common law basis to overturn."

A Tokyo court in December 2019 awarded Itō 3.3 million yen (US$30,000) plus additional fees in damages from Yamaguchi, however he stated that he will appeal the decision (she had initially sought from Yamaguchi 11 million yen (US$100,000) in compensation). Yamaguchi denied the charges and filed a countersuit against Itō, seeking 130 million yen (US$1,180,000) in compensation, claiming the incident was consensual and the ensuing accusations has damaged his reputation, although that suit was later turned down due to inconsistencies in his testimony. This ruling has garnered international press due to the lack of reported sexual assaults in Japan and the amount of societal and legal obstacles Itō had to endure for speaking up.

The Japanese high court upheld the lower court ruling in favor of Itō ordering Yamaguchi to pay 3.3 million yen to her. The presiding judge concluded that Yamaguchi began sexual intercourse with an unconscious Itō. The court also ordered Itō to pay 550,000 yen to Yamaguchi for damages for defaming him by claiming in her book accusing him of giving her a date rape drug with no evidence. Both have appealed their rulings.  The top court upheld the lower court ruling ordering Yamaguchi to pay Ito 3.3 million yen in damages. The top court also ordered Ito to pay Yamaguchi 550,000 yen for defamation. 

In 2017, Itō's memoir about the alleged incident and her experiences that followed, Black Box, was published in Japanese. It was awarded the best journalism award by the Free Press Association of Japan in 2018. An English translation of the book by Allison Markin Powell was published on July 13, 2021.

Defamation lawsuit against Mio Sugita
In August 2020 Itō sued Japanese lower house member Mio Sugita of the ruling Liberal Democratic Party. Itō alleged that Sugita clicked "like" on a number of Twitter tweets that defamed her character. The lawsuit described some 25 defamatory tweets against Itō that Sugita interacted with, which included "botched attempt at obtaining work/job through sexual advances", "honey trap", and "publicity stunt".

The lawsuit was originally dismissed by the Tokyo District Court, which excused the lawmaker's actions by opining that a "like" was not necessarily a statement of support, as users may merely employ the tool as a sort of "bookmark". In October 2022 the Tokyo High Court reversed the lower court's decision and ordered Sugita to pay Itō ¥550,000 in damages. The High Court found that the "like" did express support for defamatory content against Ms. Itō and infringed on her dignity, moreover, the consequential wide dissemination of the negative post constituted defamatory conduct beyond the limit, noting that Ms. Sugita, a National Diet member with over 100,000 followers, has influence beyond any ordinary citizen.

Defamation suit against Toshiko Hasumi

The Tokyo High Court awarded Itō ¥1.1 million on 10 November 2022 in a case against the cartoonist Toshiko Hasumi, who had posted five tweets between June 2017 and December 2019 suggesting Itō's rape accusations were false.  The tweets included an illustration of an Itō look-alike with the term makura eigyō (枕営業, "pillow business" or "sleeping one's way to the top").  Hasumi asserted the illustration was not of Itō, but the court found it "an insult exceeding the permissible limits under social norms".

Awards
Free Press Association of Japan- Freedom Of The Press Award (2018) for Black Box
New York Festivals - silver award (2018) for directing Undercover Asia: Lonely Deaths
Newsweek 100 Most Respected Japanese (2019)
Time 100 (2020) for her activism
Tokyo Docs "Short Documentary Showcase Excellent Film Award" (2020) for directing I Killed My Flowers
One Young World "One Young World Journalist of the Year 2022" for positive social impact of her work

Explanatory notes

References

Living people
1989 births
Japanese women's rights activists
Japanese journalists
Japanese expatriates in the United Kingdom
Japanese expatriates in the United States
Rape in Japan
Violence against women in Japan